Sergei Pantilimonovich Babinov (born 11 July 1955 in Chelyabinsk, Soviet Union) is a retired ice hockey player who played in the Soviet Hockey League.

Babinov played for Traktor Chelyabinsk, Krylya Sovetov Moscow and HC CSKA Moscow. He competed at the 1976 Winter Olympics. and was inducted into the Russian and Soviet Hockey Hall of Fame in 1979.

References

External links
 
 
 
 

1955 births
Living people
Brest Albatros Hockey players
HC CSKA Moscow players
Krylya Sovetov Moscow players
Olympic medalists in ice hockey
Sportspeople from Chelyabinsk
Traktor Chelyabinsk players
Ice hockey players at the 1976 Winter Olympics
Olympic ice hockey players of the Soviet Union
Olympic gold medalists for the Soviet Union